"Everything Will B-Fine" is a song recorded by Lisa Lisa and Cult Jam from their 1987 album Spanish Fly. The song hit number nine on the Billboard R&B Singles chart and number twenty-two on the Dance chart. The song was their first not to chart on the Billboard Hot 100.

Charts

References

External links
 Everything Will B-Fine at Discogs.

1988 singles
Lisa Lisa and Cult Jam songs
1988 songs
Columbia Records singles
Song recordings produced by Full Force